Takkar is a 1980 Hindi-language action film directed by K. Bapayya. It stars Ashok Kumar, Sanjeev Kumar, Jeetendra, Zeenat Aman and Jaya Prada, with music composed by R. D. Burman. It is produced by G. A. Seshagiri Rao under the Padmalaya Studios banner and presented by Krishna. The film is a remake of the Telugu movie Devudu Chesina Manushulu (1973).

This film is the debut of Padmalaya Studios into Bollywood and after this they have made nearly 20 films in Hindi, such as Himmatwala, Justice Chaudhry, Sooryavansham, Aamdani Atthani Kharcha Rupaiyaa etc.

Plot
The film begins with a notorious gang that sacrileges the idols from the temples. Suraj a valiant is one among them. Once, they plan a train robbery for a precious idol when Ranjeet a mobster, slays out a priest. As it happens, a passenger Sapna, sister of a millionaire Vinod Saxena, braves which influences Suraj. So, he safeguards the passengers, in that mishap, Suraj & Sapna fall in love. Afterward, safely leaving Sapna at her doorstep, Suraj lands at an estate owned by a Zamindar. Vijay son of Zamindar is a vagabond who leads a frolicking life. He is grappled by Suraj while teasing a laborer Ganga. In that rage, Vijay hits Suraj hard when Zamindar hinders. Then, Suraj realizes himself as Kishan, the long-lost son of Zamindar but considering uncertainties, he stands back. Being a stepson, Suraj is envied by Zamindar’s wife Kaushalya. Moreover, her sly brother intrigues her to eliminate Suraj from which he has escaped. Now, Zamindar accommodates him and also accords the household responsibilities.

Next, Suraj seeks to remove the flaws of Vijay and his sister Meena which makes Vijay quit the house. Destiny makes Zamindar & Vinod’s families friends even Sapna & Meena. Further, it reunites Suraj & Sapna when he divulges the fact and requests to maintain silence. Besides, Ganga suffers from her sick mother & drunkard brother Pritam. Vijay aspires to possess her but he reforms by her virtue. Here, Vinod turns into the quarterback of gangsters, and Meena is also associated with them by bullying. Exploiting it, they heist Lord Krishna’s idol from Zamindar’s residence. Witnessing it, Suraj incriminates himself to save Meena. So, Vinod seizes Geeta when Suraj breaks the bars and chases them. However, Vijay misinterprets and charges Suraj when he affirms his identity and they fuse. Parallelly, Pritam senses the activities of Vinod and informs Suraj & Vijay. Knowing it, Sapna also joins, and all reach the base camp and rescue Meena. At that moment, surprisingly, it is uncovered that the real Vinod is different from whom the quarterback abducted and purported to the world. Since he is a beau of Meena, the duplicate made her a puppet at their fingertips. Now, the racketeers conspire to export the adored idols. At last, Suraj & Vijay intrepidly encounter and cease them. Finally, the movie ends on a happy note with the reunion of family and the marriages of Suraj & Sapna, Vijay & Ganga, and Vinod & Meena.

Cast

Ashok Kumar as Zamindar
Sanjeev Kumar as Kishan / Suraj
Jeetendra as Vijay
Vinod Mehra as Vinod / Boss (Double Role)
Zeenat Aman as Sapna
Jaya Prada as Ganga
Bindiya Goswami as Meena
Ranjeet as Ranjeet
Jeevan as Mamaji
Sujit Kumar as Police Inspector
Leela Chitnis as Ganga & Preetam's Mother
Kamini Kaushal as Kaushalya
Asrani as Preetam
Mukri as Mary's Father
Mac Mohan as Goon
Komila Virk as Mary
Asha Sachdev as Special Appearance
Prema Narayan as Special Appearance

Soundtrack 
Music: R. D. Burman, Lyrics: Anand Bakshi

References

External links
 

Films directed by K. Bapayya
Films scored by R. D. Burman
Hindi remakes of Telugu films
1980s Hindi-language films